Zelic or Zelić (Serbian Cyrillic: Зелић) is a Serbian and Croatian surname that may refer to:

 Antonio Zelić (born 1994), Croatian bobsledder
 Gerasim Zelić (1752–1828), Serbian Orthodox cleric
 Ivan Zelic (born 1978), Australian football player
 Lucy Zelić (born 1986), Australian television presenter, sister of Ivan and Ned
 Ned Zelic (born 1971), Australian football player, brother of Ivan
 Obrad Zelić (born 1946), Serbian physician

Serbian surnames
Croatian surnames